The Shapira Hotel, at 209 N. Madison St. in Madisonville, Texas was built in 1904.  It was listed on the National Register of Historic Places in 1980.

It has elements of Queen Anne architecture. It has also been known as Wills Hotel.

References

External links

		
National Register of Historic Places in Texas
Queen Anne architecture in Texas
Hotel buildings completed in 1904